Maianthemum mexicanum is a perennial, terrestrial herb found as an understory species in moist forests. It is endemic to west-central Mexico.

Description
Roots are set along the rhizome. Stems are erect and grow in a zig-zag pattern. They are usually hairless but there may be small hairs on the ribs.

Leaves
Leaf blades are hairless, lance- to egg-shaped with pointed tips and rounded to tapered bases. The upper surface is green, the lower glaucous.

Flowering clusters
Up to 110 flowers are set on an elongated panicle, that becomes diffusely branched in at maturity. The main axis is 6 cm long. Short side branches (<1 cm long) have 4-10 flowers each.

Flowers and fruits  
The flowers are yellowish-white, set on 0.7 to 1.5 mm long pedicels that have small, conical hairs. Tepals are ascending, inconspicuous and about 1 mm long. Stamens are inserted at the tepal bases. Fruits are rounded, 5–7 mm across, ripening to reddish brown.

Distribution
Maianthemum mexicanum is reported from the west-central Mexican states of Sinaloa and Durango.

Habitat and ecology
In Durango it has been found in wet hillside Pseudotsuga - Abies forests from 2800 to 2850 m elevation.

Similar species
Maianthemum racemosum is similar, but it has a panicle that is pyramidal in shape, with well-developed secondary axes mostly longer than 1 cm long. The panicle of M. mexicanum has an elongated main axis with short side branches, usually <1 cm long.

References

Bibliography
García-Arévalo. 1992. Maianthemum mexicanum una Nueva Especie de Durang. Acta Botánica Mexicana (1992), 17:19-2

mexicanum
Flora of Durango
Flora of Sinaloa
Plants described in 1992